Music Man is an American guitar and bass guitar manufacturer. Originally formed in 1971 by Forrest White and Tom Walker, along with Leo Fender as a silent partner, the company started manufacturing electric and bass guitars under the Music Man name in 1974. In 1984 it was acquired by Ernie Ball.

History

Early years 

In 1971, Forrest White and Tom Walker formed Tri-Sonix, Inc. Walker had previously been a sales representative at Fender. Walker approached Leo Fender about financial help in the founding. Because of a ten-year non-compete clause in the 1965 contract that sold the Fender companies to the CBS Corporation, Leo Fender became a silent partner.

White had worked with Leo Fender since 1954, in the very early days of the Fender Electric Instrument Manufacturing Company as the plant manager. Eventually, he became vice president, and stayed on after the company was sold to CBS, but grew unhappy with their management and resigned in 1966. Fender did not like the corporate name, so it changed first to Musitek, Inc., and in January 1974 the final name, Music Man, appeared.  In 1974, the company started producing its first product, an amplifier designed by Leo Fender and Tom Walker called the "Sixty Five," a hybrid of tube and solid-state technology. The number of designs rapidly increased, and 15 of the 28 pages from the 1976 catalogue were dedicated to amplification. 

In 1975, Fender's legal restriction expired and, after a vote of the board, he was named the president of Music Man. Fender also operated a consulting firm, CLF Research, in Fullerton, California. By 1976, it had built a manufacturing facility for musical instruments, and was contracted to make Music Man products. In June 1976, production started on guitars and in August basses followed. These instruments were designed by Fender and White. The 1976 catalogue shows the first offerings: a two-pickup guitar, the StingRay 1, and the StingRay bass. Both instruments featured bolt-on neck designs. The basses featured a distinctive 3+1 tuner arrangement to help eliminate "dead spots," while the guitars came with a traditional, Fender-style 6-on-a-side tuner array. The StingRay Bass featured a single large humbucking pickup (located somewhat toward but not adjacent to the bridge) with a two-band fixed-frequency EQ. A row of string mutes sat on the bridge. Basses were produced in fretted and fretless versions.

Tom Walker played a large part in the design of the bass preamp. They were the first production guitar and basses to use active electronics which could boost levels in selected frequency bands. The preamps were coated with epoxy to prevent reverse engineering. The StingRay Bass sold well, but the guitar met with little success. In December 1978, a two-pickup bass was introduced called the Sabre (discontinued in 1991). A redesigned guitar bearing the same name followed. Both sold poorly.

CLF Research and Music Man were treated as separate companies, CLF was headed by Fender, White and Walker headed Music Man. Fender made the guitars and basses, while White and Walker's company made the amplifiers and sold accessories. The instruments were made at CLF and shipped to the Music Man warehouse, where each instrument was inspected and tested. Problems with fibers in the finish caused Music Man's inspectors to reject a high percentage of the instruments, and return them to CLF for refinishing. Since Music Man didn't pay CLF Research until the instrument finishes were deemed acceptable, a rift developed between CLF and Music Man over payment.

Low sales stressed the staff. The company's internal conflicts caused Leo Fender to form another partnership:
Leo had decided to market guitars under another name besides Music Man in 10/79 due to tension between CLF and Music Man. Production of bodies and necks for both Music Man and G&L were concurrent up to and including March 1981. G&L was incorporated May 1980, although some early models with the moniker "G&L" have body dates from March 1980.
In an interview conducted by Gav Townsing, George Fullerton offers this scenario:

"At the end of 1979 we stopped building for Music Man and never made another item for them. We really weren’t friends at that point and not even talking."

In November 1979, were cut with Leo Fender, who disliked Music Man's pressure. A contract was given to Grover Jackson to build bass bodies and assemble the instruments with CLF necks and the remaining CLF hardware. When CLF stopped making necks Jackson made those also.

Given this climate, the StingRay guitar was quietly dropped from the line, while the Sabre guitar production continued until 1984. A graphite-neck StingRay Bass debuted in 1980. Fender had been opposed to the idea. The guitar was called the Cutlass (with a 'Cutlass II' variant with two pickups) and had a neck was made by Modulus and new translucent finishes. The new guitars were able to turn the financial tide and by 1984 the company was near bankruptcy. After looking at a few offers Music Man was sold to Ernie Ball on March 7, 1984. Music Man's remaining physical assets were sold on June 1, 1984. The production of amplifiers, which were manufactured at a separate factory, ceased.

Rebirth 

Ernie Ball had started producing a modern acoustic bass guitar in 1972 under the name Earthwood. Ball's partner in this company was George Fullerton. The factory, which Ball still owned at the time of the Music Man purchase, was located in San Luis Obispo, California and that is where Music Man started producing basses in 1985.

Ernie Ball Music Man improved their visibility in the guitar market with a succession of new guitar models, which were largely player-endorsed. They also introduced a series of new electric bass models. Despite this, none of these could compete against Fender or Gibson on sales figures.

Entry-level versions 
In the late 1990s, demand for cheaper versions of Music Man instruments had increased, and other companies had begun to exploit this market gap by producing replica instruments in various East-Asian countries. Music Man responded by licensing its designs to HHI/Davitt & Hanser, launching OLP (Officially Licensed Products) to give Music Man market coverage in this price point. This agreement continued until 2008.

As a replacement for the OLP instruments, the company developed an in-house line of guitars and basses. Initially branded as S.U.B. for "Sport Utility Bass," this became the non-acronym "SUB" after two models of six-string guitar were launched. This mid-range line, with production cost one-third to one-half less than the "standard" Music Man instruments, was launched in 2003, with the goal of proving that a quality instrument without the bells and whistles could be made in the USA. Produced at the same facilities as the Music Man models, the major defining factors of the SUBs were a non-angled "slab" body finished with a textured (non-polished) paint, as well as necks with a matte painted back instead of the "oil and wax" finish applied to the higher-end models. Savings were realized largely from reduced production time, as opposed to cutting the quality of the wood, hardware, or electronics, allowing the SUB lines to achieve their price-point. The product was a success, and supported Music Man when its main line was in a slump. The SUB models were eventually discontinued in September 2006. Sterling Ball commented that, due to the quickly growing $1,000+ segment of the guitar industry, there were fewer and fewer SUBs in production each year.

In 2009, as a replacement for the SUB line, Music Man licensed Praxis Musical Instruments to build a new import budget brand, Sterling by Music Man.  In 2012, Praxis expanded this line with the "Sterling By Music Man SUB Series" to compete with other sub-$300 USD "beginner" instruments. They were produced in Indonesia and other Far East countries using "non-standard" woods (I.E. not typically thought of as "tonewoods") to keep production costs low.

New models 

Music Man introduced the Sterling bass as a smaller, lighter alternative to the Stingray in July 1993.  The Sterling also had a slimmer neck profile with 22 frets and a triple-coil pickup with a 3 way switch.  The pickup could operate as a standard Humbucker in series and parallel mode and utilized a "phantom-coil" when in single coil mode.

2003 saw the introduction of the Music Man Bongo Bass, the result of a partnership with DesignworksUSA, a design firm better known for its work with BMW. This bass features a 24-fret rosewood fingerboard with "moon"-shaped inlays and a four-band active EQ powered by an 18V supply. The Bongo was made available with four or five strings, in fretted or fretless and left-handed versions, with the choice of HS (humbucker/single-coil), HH (dual humbuckers), and H (single humbucker, the traditional Music Man setup) pickup configurations and a pickup blend pot for ultimate versatility. These pickup configurations were adopted on other Music Man models three years later, using a five-way pickup selector with coil-tap capabilities.

In 2008, Music Man released the Bongo 6, its first six-string bass. Sterling Ball had previously said "We won't be making any six-string basses unless a high-profile player asks for one," until John Myung (Dream Theater) collaborated on the prototype Bongo.

Music Man introduced the Big Al bass, based on the Albert Lee signature guitar, with an 18V-powered 4-band EQ, active/passive switching, series/parallel pickup wiring and three single-coil pickups with neodymium magnets. As of 2010, the 'Big Al' bass came in a five-string version with the choice of H and SSS pickup configurations. The Big Al and Reflex basses were discontinued in 2015.

The JPX' introduced 2010, is a variant of the John Petrucci signature model, commemorating the ten-year collaboration with Petrucci. The new body shape has a slightly thinner upper horn and a more symmetric bridge end profile. The body is also chambered for added acoustic resonance.

Music Man launched the Bass Player Live Deluxe Classic Collection, with elements of the first Music Man basses—a two-band EQ, a chrome truss rod wheel, vintage skinny fret wire and nut, and hardened steel bridge plate with "Classic" stainless steel saddles and adjustable mute pads, 7.5" radius neck—with modern details such as a six-bolt neck mounting. Models include the StingRay, StingRay 5, and Sterling.

Introduced in 2018, the Stingray Special series includes revamped versions of the StingRay and StingRay 5 basses with new pickups and an 18-volt preamp.

Recent years 

In 1996, Ernie Ball/Music Man began an annual 'Battle of the Bands' contest to spotlight unsigned talent.

In 2000, Ernie Ball/Music Man was raided by the copyright lobby group the Business Software Alliance and accused of having unlicensed software installed at its premises. Following a court settlement, the BSA used Ernie Ball/Music Man as an example in advertisements and industry publications; Sterling Ball, son of Ernie Ball, was so offended at this treatment that he had all Microsoft software removed from Ernie Ball/Music Man ("I don't care if we have to buy 10,000 abacuses,") and imposed an open-source software policy across the company.

Notable models 
 StingRay

References

External links

 Official website

Bass guitar manufacturing companies
Guitar manufacturing companies of the United States